Walkinstown is a suburb of Dublin in Ireland, six kilometres southwest of the city centre. It is surrounded by Drimnagh to the north, Crumlin to the east, Greenhills to the south, and Ballymount, Bluebell, and Clondalkin to the west. Its postal code is Dublin 12.

It consists mainly of privately owned housing, with some social housing remaining in the Dublin City Council area between the Walkinstown and Long Mile Roads and Ballymount Lower. It was built as an estate of starter homes after World War II.

Light industry, warehousing, car dealerships, and commercial outlet stores are concentrated along the Long Mile Road in the western sector of the suburb. The national census of 2016 recorded a local population of 6,819 people. Walkinstown has a library, residents' association, sports ground, community centre, schools, pubs, church, and local shops.

Name and History

The name of the area is a corruption of Wilkinstown – named after Wilkins, a tenant farmer who lived in the area in the 15th century.

Walkinstown as a suburb was a 20th-century creation. The area was a dairy farm until house building began in the 1930s and ended in the 1970s when most of the land was built on. A Catholic church and primary and secondary schools were built in the 1950s.

One of the most iconic moments from Ireland's unexpected success in Italia 90, the 1990 FIFA World Cup, took place at Walkinstown roundabout on 25 June 1990. That afternoon, after Ireland beat Romania on penalties to make it through to the quarter finals of the competition, crowds emerged from the nearby public houses of the Kestrel and Cherry Tree and invaded the roundabout to celebrate the win. Amateur footage of the joyous scenes at the junction became synonymous with Ireland's success that year and epitomised the sense of hope prevailing throughout the country at the time. In July 2020, ten days after Ireland's Italia 90 football manager Jack Charlton passed away, fans gathered at the roundabout to recreate the moment and pay their respects. Put 'Em Under Pressure, the official song of the Republic of Ireland national football team's 1990 campaign, (which features soundbites of Charlton) was played at 12:30pm that day synchronised with all radio stations nationally to remember the man who had led Ireland to their first-ever major tournament at Euro '88, as well as two World Cups in Italy (1990) and USA (1994).

Location and extent

There is some ambiguity as to the full extent of the suburb, with some claiming Walkinstown includes Greenhills, as well as one of three parts of Ballymount.

Greenhills was previously linked to Walkinstown in the Catholic Church structure to make up the Parish of Walkinstown and Greenhills, at a time when Greenhills did not have its own local church. This combined parish ceased to exist when Greenhills acquired its own parish church in 1971. Greenhills is generally regarded now as a separate and distinct suburb, with its own identity and full range of services.

The distinction between Ballymount and Walkinstown is not so well defined. Given that Ballymount has a less clear identity, many consider it to form part of Walkinstown. The area itself is primarily given over to light industry with much less residential housing than its nearest neighbour, Walkinstown. Most residential housing which exists directly borders on the Ballymount Road which itself is often listed as being in Walkinstown. Residents of Ballymount do not have their own services and so rely on Walkinstown for schools, church and commercial centres.

Amenities

Walkinstown Public Library is a branch of Dublin City Public Libraries and Archive on Percy French Road. The local post office is in the supermarket on Walkinstown Road. Walkinstown Credit Union, which is affiliated to the Irish League of Credit Unions, has an office on Walkinstown Green.

The local Catholic Church, Our Lady of the Assumption on Kilnamanagh Road, is one of the largest buildings in the suburb. It forms part of a concentration of religious and educational services with a girls' school, Our Lady of the Assumption, beside the church and a boys' school, Drimnagh Castle CBS, across the Long Mile Road. Both schools provide primary and secondary education.

Walkinstown Park on Walkinstown Avenue is run by Dublin City Council. It has three football pitches and two Gaelic Athletic Association pitches. There is a tennis court, and a stream at the rear of the park.
 
The premises of the Walkinstown Association, which provides services to people with intellectual disabilities, is on the Long Mile Road beside the Halfway House public house.

The 94th Dublin Scout Den is on Bunting Road.

Walkinstown is served by six pubs located in two hubs. The first is at the intersection of the Drimnagh, Walkinstown, and Long Mile roads, while the second is at the Walkinstown Roundabout. The six pubs are the Halfway House, the Castle Inn, The Black Forge, The Eleanora, the Cherrytree, and the Kestrel House. Previously, Walkinstown was said to be served by six "and a half" pubs. The "half pub" referred to The Submarine Bar which, although almost entirely located in Crumlin, had its main entrance on Cromwellsfort Road in Walkinstown.

There is no local Garda Síochána (police) station. Crime protection is provided by two  stations in nearby Crumlin – the Crumlin Village and Sundrive Road stations. The three local hospitals are Tallaght Hospital, Our Lady's Children's Hospital, Crumlin, and St. James's Hospital.

Shopping

There is a SuperValu supermarket on Walkinstown Road. The Ashleaf Shopping Centre on Cromwellsfort Road is the nearest shopping centre where the anchor tenant, Dunnes Stores, provides supermarket and clothing retail services. A Lidl supermarket is on Walkinstown Avenue while an Aldi supermarket is on Long Mile Road.

Small commercial services such as newsagents, pharmacies, and fast food restaurants are concentrated at the intersection of the Drimnagh, Walkinstown, and Long Mile roads as well as around the Walkinstown Roundabout. There is also a Subway restaurant and Eddie Rockets restaurant, with a Polish food shop behind the Lidl supermarket on Walkinstown Avenue.

Walkinstown Roundabout is one of the busiest in the city. Its construction was held up for many years due to protracted negotiations to purchase a small whitewashed cottage on the then Walkinstown Cross (scene of many bad motor crashes). The resident was eventually rehoused in a new bungalow at the top of Walkinstown Avenue. This cottage was formerly in the centre of the new roundabout.

Local landmarks

One of the oldest buildings in Walkinstown is Drimnagh Castle on the northern side of Long Mile Road. It dates from 1216 and is the only castle in Ireland with a flooded moat. The Halfway House pub is the oldest one in the area, predating all of the modern housing developments. The pub used to be a coachhouse, halfway between Dublin and Tallaght.

Walkinstown Roundabout or Walkinstown Cross is one of the largest and most accident-prone roundabouts in Dublin. This junction serves seven local roads – Walkinstown Road towards Drimnagh, Bunting Road towards Crumlin, Cromwellsfort Road towards Kimmage and Crumlin, and St Peter's Road towards Greenhills and Templeogue, Greenhills Road towards Tallaght, Ballymount Road towards Ballymount and the M50 and Walkinstown Avenue towards Ballyfermot,

An area of Walkinstown north of Cromwellsfort Road is known as the Musical Roads. Roads in this area are named after prominent figures of Irish music such as the tenor Count John McCormack and composers Michael William Balfe, Percy French, and Edward Bunting.

Administration

Walkinstown is in the southwest of the Dublin City Council area and in local government elections is part of the Ballyfermot-Drimnagh Ward. Since the last local elections in 2014, local representatives on the council are:
 Paul Hand (Independent)
 Daithí Doolan (Sinn Féin)
 Vincent Jackson (Independent)
 Greg Kelly (Sinn Féin)
 Bríd Smith (People Before Profit)
 Daithí de Róiste (Fianna Fáil)

Walkinstown is part of the Dublin South-Central Dáil constituency. The teachtaí dála for the current 33rd Dáil Éireann are:
 Patrick Costello (Green Party)
 Joan Collins (I4C)
 Bríd Smith (S–PBP)
 Aengus Ó Snodaigh (Sinn Féin)

Sport

The first local Gaelic Athletic Association (GAA) club was formed in the 1950s since when it amalgamated with others to form the present St James Gaels GAA club.

Walkinstown Athletic Football Club is the local soccer team. Walkinstown Sports and Athletic Association (WSAF) meets at Moeran Community Hall on Summerville Drive. Mooney's Field, the largest green open space in the area, is used for many field sports. The nearest municipal swimming pool is in Crumlin village.

Walkinstown United Football Club,  established in 1978 and based in Walkinstown Park, is the leading football team.

Transportation

Walkinstown is served by Dublin Bus routes 18, 27, 77A, 56A, 123 and 151. The 9, 17 and 150 busses pass the Ashleaf Shopping Centre/Submarine Bar, while the 122 bus terminates at Our Lady's Hospital, Crumlin, five minutes walk from the Halfway House pub.

The Dublin Bus Nitelink 77N  service provides a one-way link from the city to Walkinstown after daily bus services finish at 23:30.

The Luas tram Red Line route stops nearby at Bluebell and Kylemore.

A former DHL Express mail courier depot in Walkinstown closed in 2008 and since 2018 is the primary depot for the Go-Ahead Ireland bus service.

People

 Gabriel Byrne, actor
 Eamonn Campbell of The Dubliners musical group lived in Walkinstown
 Eamon Coughlan, Olympic runner
 Dean Delany, goalkeeper for Shelbourne Football Club
 Kevin Moran, Gaelic Athletic Association and association football player
 Dee Devlin, partner of martial artist and businessman Conor McGregor

See also
 List of towns and villages in Ireland

References

External links
 Walkinstown Association
 Walkinstown United Football Club
  Walkinstown Public Library
  Walkinstown Post Office
 Drimnagh Castle Boys Secondary School
 Assumption Girls National School Walkinstown
 94th Walkinstown Scouts
 Church of the Assumption (Catholic) Walkinstown
 Walkinstown Social Services Centre
 Dublin City Council
 Citizen's Information Bureau

Towns and villages in Dublin (city)